George Woytkiw (July 5, 1903 – August 31, 1956) was a provincial politician from Alberta, Canada. He served as a member of the Legislative Assembly of Alberta for only two months in 1940. He sat as a Social Credit member from the constituency of Vegreville before he resigned his seat to Solon Earl Low after a by-election on June 20, 1940.

References

1956 deaths
1903 births
Alberta Social Credit Party MLAs
People from Trail, British Columbia
People from Vegreville